Astrid Tollefsen (11 December 1897 – 9 October 1973) was a Norwegian poet. She was born in Horten. She made her literary debut with the poetry collection Portrett i speil (1947). She lived in a long-term relationship with the lyricist Gunvor Hofmo.

Tollefsen was awarded the Norwegian Critics Prize for Literature in 1967 for the poetry collection Hendelser.

Awards 
Gyldendal's Endowment 1958
Norwegian Critics Prize for Literature 1967

References

1897 births
1973 deaths
20th-century Norwegian poets
Norwegian women poets
20th-century Norwegian women writers
Lesbian poets
Norwegian LGBT poets
Norwegian lesbian writers
People from Horten
20th-century Norwegian LGBT people